Bradford Smith may refer to:

 Bradford A. Smith (1931–2018), American astronomer
 Brad Smith (American lawyer) (Bradford L. Smith, born 1959), American attorney and technology executive
 Bradford S. Smith (born 1950), American Republican Party politician

See also
Bradford Smith Building, historic building in New Bedford, Massachusetts